This is an alphabetical listing of notable mosques in the United States (Arabic: Masjid, Spanish: Mezquita), including Islamic places of worship that do not qualify as traditional mosques.

History of mosques in the United States
A mosque, also called masjid in Arabic, is defined as any place that Muslims pray facing Mecca, not necessarily a building. By that meaning, there were mosques in the United States by 1731 or earlier. Job ben Solomon (1701–1773), an African-American Muslim kidnapped into slavery, was documented by his slave narrative memoir to have prayed in the forest of Kent Island, Maryland, where he was brought during 1731–33.

Some sources assert that what is likely the first American mosque building was a mosque in Biddeford, Maine that was founded in 1915 by Albanian Muslims. A Muslim cemetery still existed there in 1996.

However, the first purpose-built mosque building was most likely the Highland Park Mosque in Detroit, Michigan, opened in 1921. The mosque was located near the famous Highland Park Ford Plant, which employed "hundreds of Arab American men". This mosque, which included Sunni, Shia and Ahmadi Muslims, was funded by Muhammad Karoub, a real estate developer.

The earliest mosque of the Ahmadiyya Muslims Community is the Al-Sadiq Mosque, a two story building purchased by Mufti Muhammad Sadiq in 1922 in the Bronzeville neighborhood of Chicago, the original building was torn down and a purpose built mosque was constructed at the site in 1990s. However, the first "purpose-built" mosque, the Mother Mosque of America, was built in 1934 in Cedar Rapids, Iowa.

In 1994, the Islamic Center of Yuba City, in California, was destroyed by fire set in a hate-crime, the first mosque destroyed by a hate crime in U.S. history. It had just been completed at the cost of $1.8 million plus sweat equity of the Muslims of its rural community, including descendants of Pakistani who immigrated to the area  1902. Its story, including its rebuilding, is told in David Washburn's 2012 documentary An American Mosque.

Growth in the 21st century
It has been estimated that there were somewhat more than 100 mosques in the U.S. in 1970, but immigration of more than a million Muslims since then led to hundreds more being built. By 2000, there were 1,209 U.S. mosques, which rose to 2,106 in 2010, an increase of 74%. Also, the number of mosques in America has grown to 2,769 in 2020.

A 2011 study, The American Mosque 2011, sponsored by the Hartford Institute for Religion Research, the Association of Statisticians of American Religious Bodies, as well as the nation's largest Islamic civic and religious groups, including the Islamic Society of North America and the Council on American-Islamic Relations, found that the U.S. states with the most mosques were New York with 257, California with 246, and Texas with 166.

Since 2014, a building boom for mosques has been going on.

Notable individual mosques

See also

 Islam in the United States
 Lists of mosques (worldwide)
 List of mosques in Canada
 List of mosques in Brazil
 List of mosques in Mexico
 List of mosques in the Americas (Latin & South America)
 List of the oldest mosques in the world
 Religious buildings and structures in the United States

References

External links
Mosques and Centers, by U.S. state, a directory of addresses & phone numbers, at BLDUSA.COM (a commercial business links directory)
Mosques and Islamic Centers in Greater Chicago, at the Council of Islamic Organizations of Greater Chicago (CIOGC)
Lecture: Brief history of Islam in America, YouTube video
The History of Islam in America – By Sulayman Nyang, YouTube video
Islam in America, YouTube video

United States
Mosques